An escape room is a type of puzzle game room, which people enter to solve a puzzle to exit the room.

Escape Room may also refer to:

Entertainment
 PanIQ Escape Room, founded 2014, and escape room facilities by PanIQ Entertainment

Film
 Escape Room (2017 film), starring Annabelle Stephenson and Elisabeth Hower
 Escape Room (2018 film), an American horror film directed by Peter Dukes and starring Skeet Ulrich
 Escape Room (2019 film), an American horror film directed by Adam Robitel
 Escape Room: Tournament of Champions, a 2021 American psychological horror film directed by Adam Robitel

Gaming
 Escape the room,  escape room, room escape, escape game, a genre of video game from the late 1980s

Television
 "Escape Room" (Schitt's Creek), the 2020 Schitt's Creek episode The Bachelor Party

See also 
 Emergency exit room
 Escape crew capsule, escape capsule that allows one or more occupants of an aircraft or spacecraft to escape from the craft
 Escape pod, capsule or craft used to escape a vessel in an emergency
 Rescue Chamber (disambiguation)
 Escape (disambiguation)